James W. Lenman is a British philosopher and Professor of Philosophy at the University of Sheffield.
He is known for his expertise on ethics.
Lenman is a former president of the British Society for Ethical Theory (2002-2008).

Books
 Constructivism in Practical Philosophy, edited by James Lenman and Yonatan Shemmer, Oxford University Press, 2012

See also
Illusionism (philosophy)

References

External links
Personal Website
James Lenman at the University of Sheffield
James Lenman, Google Scholar

21st-century British philosophers
Philosophy academics
Living people
Alumni of St Catherine's College, Oxford
Analytic philosophers
Academics of the University of Sheffield
Academics of the University of Glasgow
Academics of Lancaster University
Alumni of the University of St Andrews
People educated at the High School of Dundee
Date of birth missing (living people)
Year of birth missing (living people)